Balanchine technique or Balanchine method is the ballet performance style invented by dancer, choreographer, and teacher George Balanchine (1904–1983), and a trademark of the George Balanchine Foundation. It is used widely today in many of Balanchine's choreographic works. It is employed by ballet companies and taught in schools throughout North America, including the New York City Ballet and School of American Ballet, where it first emerged.

History
In 1924, Balanchine left the Soviet Union and joined Sergei Diaghilev's Ballets Russes in Paris as a choreographer and ballet master. After the death of Diaghilev in 1929, Lincoln Kirstein persuaded him to come to the United States in 1934. There, with Kirstein as his partner, he founded the School of American Ballet in New York City.

During his time in Europe, Balanchine had begun to develop his neoclassical style, partially as a reaction to the Romantic anti-classicism that had led to increased theatricality in ballet. His style focused more on dance movement and construction in relation to music than on plot or characterization. After he came to America, established his school, and eventually founded the New York City Ballet, he continued to refine the principles of training his dancers. During the course of his career, in which he choreographed more than 450 ballets, he continued to develop his style and technique of training. He became far and away the most prolific force in the nation's ballet community, which led to his long-enduring legacy.

Characteristics
Training in Balanchine technique allows dancers to utilize more space in less time, so that speed, spatial expansion and a syncopated musicality are enhanced. Specific characteristics include the following:<ref>'Suki Schorer on Balanchine Technique (1999), passim.</ref>
 extreme speed and very deep plié emphasis on line, with use of unconventional, asymmetrical, abstract arm and hand placement
 pirouettes en dehors taken from a lunge in fourth position rather than the conventional plié in fourth
 distinctive arabesque line with the hip open to the audience and the side arm pressed back
 athletic dance quality.

Suki Schorer has described the Balanchine arabesque as "longer, stronger and bigger". Balanchine would instruct students to "reach for diamonds" in both directions so the dancer's hands are not relaxed, creating an elongated line.

The Balanchine Essays
Toward the latter part of his life, Balanchine talked about creating a "dictionary" of his technique, a visual reference for students of ballet, but never accomplished this goal. Five months after Balanchine's death in 1983, the George Balanchine Foundation was formed to preserve his legacy. It embarked almost immediately upon the first of its major projects, The Balanchine Essays (2013), a video project produced and published by the foundation. Under the stewardship of chairman Barbara Horgan, the foundation fulfilled his wish by producing a series of video recordings demonstrating his technique.

Former New York City Ballet principal dancers Merrill Ashley and Suki Schorer are the co-creators of the project, in which they demonstrate crucial aspects of Balanchine Style and Balanchine Technique (both registered trademarks of the George Balanchine Trust). The Balanchine Essays created by Ashley and Schorer, "provide over nine hours of visual discussion of Balanchine's interpretations of classical ballet technique that are not only educational but also protect the high standards Balanchine himself set for his dancers". The project was directed by veteran television arts director Merrill Brockway and produced by Catherine Tatge, with Barbara Horgan as the executive producer. The set of ten DVDs includes the following titles: Port de Bras & Épaulement, The Barre, Arabesque, Jumps, Pirouettes & Other Turns, Passé & Attitude, Transfer of Weight, and Pointe Technique and Pas de Bourrée''.

See also
 Ballet technique
 History of ballet

References

 
Ballet training methods